Provincial road N764 (N764) is a road connecting Rijksweg 50 (N50) in Kampen with N331 near Zwolle.

Major intersections

External links

764
764